Jeffrey Steven Teat (born April 30, 1997) is a Canadian lacrosse player for Atlas Lacrosse Club of the Premier Lacrosse League and the New York Riptide of the National Lacrosse League. He is one of three players in lacrosse history to be selected first overall in both the NLL and PLL/MLL drafts.

Early life and career 
Teat is the son of Maria and Dan Teat. Dan played fourteen seasons in NLL and is currently an assistant coach for Panther City Lacrosse Club. Teat attended The Hill Academy, playing five seasons of lacrosse there, as well as playing Junior A lacrosse for the Brampton Excelsiors, where he recorded 145 points in his final season, the most of any OJALL player since John Grant Jr.

Collegiate career 
Teat arrived at Cornell in the fall of 2016 as the number one recruit in his class according to Inside Lacrosse. With the Big Red, Teat was a three time USILA All-American and two time Tewaaraton Award nominee, as well as graduating third all time in assists and points at Cornell despite his senior season being cut short due to the COVID-19 pandemic.

NLL career 
Teat was selected first overall by the New York Riptide in the 2020 NLL Draft, although due to the pandemic, he would not make his debut until the 2022 season. During the 2022 season, Teat set a rookie record for assists and points as a rookie. He finished the season fourth in the league in total points, and second among rookies in loose balls, being named Rookie of the Year and second team all-NLL.

Heading into the 2023 NLL season, Inside Lacrosse ranked Teat the #2 best forward in the NLL.

PLL career 
Teat was originally selected by Chaos Lacrosse Club in the 2020 PLL College Draft and the Boston Cannons in the same year's MLL Draft, but he opted to return to Cornell for a fifth season instead of turning pro, causing both teams to lose his draft rights.

Teat was then drafted first overall by Atlas Lacrosse Club the following year, becoming the third player, after Lyle Thompson and Kevin Crowley to be selected first overall in the NLL and professional outdoor lacrosse drafts. He made an immediate impact, finishing second in scoring in the league despite missing two games, and being nominated for the Jim Brown MVP Award, as well as winning the Rookie of the Year Award.

International career 
Teat represented Team Canada in the 2016 Under-19 World Lacrosse Championship and 2018 World Lacrosse Championship, winning a silver medal at both events.

Statistics

NCAA

PLL

NLL

References 

Living people
1997 births
Canadian lacrosse players
Lacrosse people from Ontario
Sportspeople from Brampton
Lacrosse forwards
Cornell Big Red men's lacrosse players
New York Riptide
National Lacrosse League players
Premier Lacrosse League players
Canadian expatriate lacrosse people in the United States
Competitors at the 2022 World Games
World Games gold medalists